Menestho is a genus of very small sea snails, pyramidellid gastropod mollusks, or micromollusks.

Shell description
The original description by Möller (1842) is brief and in Latin: "Animal pede elongato, angusto; ore simplici, membrana linguali destituto; tentaculis brevioribus, crassiusculis, oculos perparvos ad basin internum ferentibus. Operculo pauco-spirato. Testa conico-turrita."

Life habits
Little is known about the biology of the members of this genus. As is true of most members of the Pyramidellidae sensu lato, they are most likely to be ectoparasites.

Species
Species within the genus Menestho include:
 Menestho acuminata Preston, 1908
 Menestho akkeshiensis Habe, 1958
 Menestho albula (Fabricius, 1780) (Type species) (as Turbo albulus)
 Menestho beermanae Jong & Coomans, 1988
 Menestho cingulitissima Nomura, 1937
 Menestho exarata A. Adams, 1861
 Menestho felix (Dall & Bartsch, 1906) 
 Menestho hypocurta (Dall & Bartsch, 1909)
 Menestho kesennumensis Nomura, 1938
 Menestho kwantoensis Nomura, 1938
 Menestho sexsulcata Nomura, 1936
 Menestho shataii Nomura, 1936
 Menestho suavis Nomura, 1936
 Menestho truncatula (Odhner, 1915)
Species brought into synonymy
 Menestho amilda Dall & Bartsch, 1909: synonym of  Odostomia amilda Dall & Bartsch, 1909
 Menestho beauforti Jacot, A.P., 1921: synonym of Boonea impressa (Say, T., 1822)
 Menestho chilensis Dall & Bartsch, 1909: synonym of Odostomia chilensis Dall & Bartsch, 1909
 Menestho cingulittissima [sic] : synonym of Menestho cingulitissima Nomura, 1937
 Menestho diaphana (Jeffreys, 1848): synonym of Ondina diaphana (Jeffreys, 1848)
 Menestho divisa (J. Adams, 1797): synonym of Ondina divisa (Adams J., 1797)
 Menestho dollfusi Locard, 1886: synonym of Euparthenia humboldti (Risso, 1826)
 Menestho exarata A. Adams, 1861: synonym of Menestho exaratissima (Dall & Bartsch, 1906)
 Menestho grijalvae (Baker, Hanna & Strong, 1928): synonym of Odostomia grijalvae Baker, Hanna & Strong, 1928
 Menestho humboldti (Risso, 1826): synonym of Euparthenia humboldti (Risso, 1826)
 Menestho morseana Bartsch, 1909: synonym of Menestho albula (Fabricius, 1780)
 Menestho tenuicula F. Nordsieck, 1972: synonym of Odostomia erjaveciana Brusina, 1869

References

 Gofas, S.; Le Renard, J.; Bouchet, P. (2001). Mollusca, in: Costello, M.J. et al. (Ed.) (2001). European register of marine species: a check-list of the marine species in Europe and a bibliography of guides to their identification. Collection Patrimoines Naturels, 50: pp. 180–213
 Spencer, H.; Marshall. B. (2009). All Mollusca except Opisthobranchia. In: Gordon, D. (Ed.) (2009). New Zealand Inventory of Biodiversity. Volume One: Kingdom Animalia. 584 pp
 Vaught, K.C. (1989). A classification of the living Mollusca. American Malacologists: Melbourne, FL (USA). . XII, 195 pp

External links 
 Menestho albula
 Menestho truncatula
 Miocene Gastropods and Biostratigraphy of the Kern River Area, California; United States Geological Survey Professional Paper 642 

Pyramidellidae